The NBR C Class (LNER Class J36) is a class of 0-6-0 steam locomotives designed by Matthew Holmes for freight work on the North British Railway (NBR). They were introduced in 1888 with inside cylinders and Stephenson valve gear. A total of 168 locomotives was built, of which 123 came into British Railways ownership at nationalisation in 1948. This was the last class of steam engine in service in Scotland.

The NBR C Class (LNER Class J32) was a class of 0-6-0 steam locomotive designed by Dugald Drummond for freight work on the North British Railway. They were built in 1876 and 1877 and had large 18-inch cylinders. A total of 32 locomotives were built. The NBR gave these engines the same designation (C class) as the Matthew Holmes engines above. The two types were very similar, and shared the same (then unusual) 18 inch cylinder size. Between 1898 and 1903, Holmes had all 32 of the Drummond locomotives rebuilt to match his own C class design. Thus the locomotives were considered a single class by the NBR, although on passing to LNER ownership they received the separate designations of J36 and J32 respectively.

Technical information
Between 1913 and 1923, the class was rebuilt with larger boilers set at 165 psi and the Reid side-window cab.

Ownership

NBR

Predecessors
After the introduction of the Drummond Class C (LNER Class J32) 18-inch cylinder 0-6-0s for use on the Waverley Line in 1876, the NBR reverted to the 17-inch design with the Drummond Class D (J34) in 1879 and the Holmes Class D (J33) in 1883.

Holmes C Class
With the opening of the second Tay Rail Bridge in July 1887 and the upcoming opening of the Forth Bridge in March 1890, the NBR needed more powerful goods locos. The result was the Holmes Class C (J36). Introduced in 1888, it was built in regular batches until 1900, eventually totalling 168 locos. 138 were built at the NBR's Cowlairs Works while the other 30 were split equally between Neilson and Company and Sharp, Stewart and Company.

World War I
During the First World War, 25 of the class were sent to France for service with the Railway Operating Division. On return to Scotland, they were given names of battles, generals and a cartoon soldier in recognition of their service. The names were hand-painted on the splasher above the middle driving wheel so often disappeared during repaints.

LNER
On 1 January 1923, all 168 locos passed into the hands of the LNER, becomingClass J36. As with all ex-NBR locos, they had 9000 added to their number. The final eight unrebuilt locos were rebuilt in 1923. In 1937, Nos. 9714 and 9716 (later 5285 and 5287) were rebuilt with cutdown chimney and dome for use on the Gartverrie Branch. In 1946 the remaining locos were renumbered from 5210 to 5346. A number of locos had tender cabs fitted for use with Snowplows.

BR

At nationalisation in 1948, 123 locos passed into service of British Railways and had 60000 added to their number. 65288 of Dunfermline (62C) and 65345 of Thornton (62A) were the last to be withdrawn on 5 June 1967. They were the last steam locomotives in service in Scotland, outlasting the LNER and BR standard designs.

Locomotive names

Preservation

One, 673 Maude (LNER number 9673; LNER 1946 number 5243; BR number 65243) has been preserved by the Scottish Railway Preservation Society at the Bo'ness and Kinneil Railway. It starred in the 2000 remake of The Railway Children on the Bluebell Railway in East Sussex.

Trivia
65288 was adopted by Dunfermline High School Railway Society and was repainted by society members while still in BR service . It was fitted with one small and one normal sized buffer at the front end.

References

Ian Allan ABC of British Railways Locomotives, 1962 edition

External links 

 Class J36 Details at Rail UK
 Scottish Railway Preservation Society page on Maude
NBR/LNER Holmes "J36" Class 0-6-0 at BRDatabase

C
0-6-0 locomotives
Neilson locomotives
Sharp Stewart locomotives
Railway locomotives introduced in 1888
Railway Operating Division locomotives
Standard gauge steam locomotives of Great Britain
Freight locomotives